Courceys is a barony in County Cork on the south coast of Ireland. Its name refers to the Norman de Courcy family, Barons Kingsale, who ruled the area from the early 13th century. The villages in the parish include Ballinspittle and Ballinadee.

Legal context
Baronies were created after the Norman invasion of Ireland as divisions of counties and were used in the administration of justice and the raising of revenue. While baronies continue to be officially defined units, they have been administratively obsolete since 1898. However, they continue to be used in land registration and in specification, such as in planning permissions. In many cases, a barony corresponds to an earlier Gaelic túath which had submitted to the Crown.

Sport
The local Gaelic Athletic Association team is Courcey Rovers GAA. The soccer team is De Courcey Albion, competing in Cork's AUL Leagues. In the 2010/2011 season, the soccer club finished second in AUL 3 and were promoted to AUL 2.

See also
 Baron Kingsale.
 List of townlands of the barony of Courceys in County Cork

Baronies of County Cork